The Battle off Fairhaven was the first naval engagement of the American Revolutionary War. The patriots also captured the 13 man crew of the Royal Navy, the first naval prisoners of the war.

Context
On April 19, 1775, the American Revolutionary War began with the Battles of Lexington and Concord in the British Province of Massachusetts Bay. Following the battle, the militia that had mustered to oppose the British besieged the city of Boston where the British troops were located.

On 13 May 1775, HMS Falcon caught two patriot vessels whose owners, Jesse Barlow and Simeon Wing—the latter's vessel commanded by his son Thomas—were from Sandwich, Massachusetts.

Engagement
A group of 30 patriots from Fairhaven were led by Captain Daniel Egery and Captain Nathaniel Pope of Fairhaven in the sloop Success (40 tons). This militia also included Benjamin Spooner, Noah Stoddard and Barnabas Hammond. They retrieved two patriot vessels captured by the British crew of Captain John Linzee (Lindsey), Royal Navy commander of HMS Falcon (14 guns, 110 men). 
The patriots took 13 British crew, the first naval prisoners of the war; two of them were wounded and one of them died.

The people of Fairhaven went on to capture additional British ships. Privateers and others operating out of Fairhaven continued to harass the British Navy throughout the war.

Footnotes

Naval battles of the American Revolutionary War
Naval battles of the American Revolutionary War involving the United States
Conflicts in 1775
1775 in the Thirteen Colonies
Battles of the American Revolutionary War in Massachusetts
Battle
Military history of New England
Fairfield